Petra Bierwirth (born 13 November 1960 in Dresden) is a German politician and member of the SPD.
She was a member of the Bundestag from 1998 to 2009.

External links
 Official website 

1960 births
Living people
Politicians from Dresden
Leipzig University alumni
Female members of the Bundestag
Members of the Bundestag for Brandenburg
21st-century German women politicians
Members of the Bundestag 2005–2009
Members of the Bundestag 2002–2005
Members of the Bundestag 1998–2002
Members of the Bundestag for the Social Democratic Party of Germany
20th-century German women